The yellow-bellied hyliota (Hyliota flavigaster) is a species of Hyliota.
It is found in Angola, Burkina Faso, Burundi, Cameroon, Central African Republic, Republic of the Congo, Democratic Republic of the Congo, Ivory Coast, Ethiopia, Gabon, Gambia, Ghana, Guinea, Guinea-Bissau, Kenya, Malawi, Mali, Mozambique, Nigeria, Rwanda, Senegal, Sierra Leone, South Sudan, Tanzania, Togo, Uganda, and Zambia.
Its natural habitat is subtropical or tropical dry forests.

References

yellow-bellied hyliota
Birds of Sub-Saharan Africa
yellow-bellied hyliota
Taxonomy articles created by Polbot